Josef Hempelmann (26 September 1893 – 27 April 1967) was a German architect and politician from the German Christian Democratic Union. He was Mayor of Lohne between 1946 and 1950.

References

1893 births
1967 deaths
Politicians from Lower Saxony
20th-century German architects
Christian Democratic Union of Germany politicians
People from Vechta (district)
Mayors of places in Lower Saxony